Deepak Thakur Sonkhla (popularly known as Deepak Thakur) is a hockey forward in Indian team.

Family
Thakur's father is an ex-serviceman and his mother a house-wife. His younger sister is a national badminton player.

Career

Junior level
Thakur became popular after his solo effort, A goal poacher, Deepak Thakur rose from the junior ranks when he scored a hat-trick in the 2001 Junior World Cup final against Australia leading India to the titleard showing 6–1. He finished the tournament with ten goals and was named the 'top scorer of the world cup . Born in hoshiarpur, Punjab.  Thakur took up hockey on his father's insistence and was among the most consistent scorers in 2003, when Indian hockey made considerable progress winning four tournaments. Thakur made up for one of the most lethal attack line along with Gagan Ajit Singh and Prabhjot Singh, in a career spanning over eight years. Has played in 2000 Sydney and 2004 Athens Olympics.

Senior level
He debuted for the senior national team in June 1999 against Germany. He was part of national squad in 2000 Sydney and 2004 Athens Olympic.

Awards
He was awarded Arjuna Award in 2004 for taking Indian hockey to next higher level.

References

External links
 Interview with Deepak Thakur : Beacon of Indian hockey
 Deepak Thakur Sonkhla profile at bharatiyahockey.org

1980 births
Male field hockey forwards
All articles with a promotional tone
Articles with a promotional tone from August 2010
Field hockey players at the 2000 Summer Olympics
Field hockey players at the 2004 Summer Olympics
2002 Men's Hockey World Cup players
2010 Men's Hockey World Cup players
Living people
Olympic field hockey players of India
Sportspeople from Hoshiarpur
Recipients of the Arjuna Award
Field hockey players from Punjab, India
Asian Games medalists in field hockey
World Series Hockey players
Field hockey players at the 2002 Asian Games
Indian male field hockey players
Asian Games silver medalists for India
Medalists at the 2002 Asian Games
Field hockey players at the 2006 Commonwealth Games
Field hockey players at the 2010 Commonwealth Games
Commonwealth Games silver medallists for India
Commonwealth Games medallists in field hockey
Medallists at the 2010 Commonwealth Games